The 38th International Emmy Awards took place on November 22, 2010, in New York City, and was hosted by actor Jason Priestley. The award ceremony, presented by the International Academy of Television Arts and Sciences (IATAS), honors all TV programming produced and originally aired outside the United States.

Ceremony 
Nominations for the 38th International Emmy Awards  were announced on October 4, 2010, by the International Academy of Television Arts & Sciences (IATAS) at a Press Conference at Mipcom in Cannes. There are 39 nominees in 10 categories. The nominees were selected over six months by a composite panel of 700 judges representing 50 countries. The British TV led, like last year, most of the International Emmys, which awards the television programs made outside the United States.

Helena Bonham Carter was awarded as best actress for her role as Enid Blyton in BBC's Enid. Bob Hoskins won the best actor award for his role in The Street, awarded in turn, as best drama series. The United Kingdom also won the best children's program awards (Shaun the Sheep) and best miniseries or TV movie, with Small Island. This year Portugal won his first Emmy for the telenovela Meu Amor. The best comedy award went to Traffic Light, an Israeli production. Romania won in the Arts Programming category with The World According to Ion B. and South Korea won for the first time in the documentary category with Mom and the Red Bean Cake.

In addition to the presentation of the International Emmy Awards for programming, the International Academy honored Lorne Michaels with the Directorate Award, and Simon Cowell with the Founders Award.

Presenters 
The following individuals, listed in order of appearance, presented awards.

Winners

Most major nominations 
By country
 — 9
 — 5

By network
BBC — 6
Rede Globo — 5

Most major awards 
By country
 — 5

By network
BBC — 5

References

External links 
 International Academy of Television Arts & Sciences Official website
 38TH INTERNATIONAL EMMY® AWARDS NOMINEES ANNOUNCED
 INTERNATIONAL EMMY AWARD WINNERS ANNOUNCED

International Emmy Awards ceremonies
2010 television awards
2010 in American television